The Women's League (WL) is a Thai semi-professional league for association football clubs. At the top of the Thai football league system, it is the country's primary football competition. Contested by 10 teams. Since 2009 it has been sponsored by Muang Thai Life Assurance, a life assurance company based in Bangkok, and are thus billed as Muang Thai Women's League.

History
There was no women's league from 2013 to 2016, so most women played for University sports teams. National women's team coach Spencer Prior and others voted for a new league to strengthen the national team.

Past champions

Thai Women's League

Thai Women's Division 1 League/Thai Women's League 2

Teams

2008–09

2010

2011

2013

2017
 Bangkok
 BRU
 BG Bundit Asia
 Chonburi Sports School
 Dhurakij Pundit
 Lampang Sports School
 Nakhon Si Lady
 Sisaket Sports School
 Thailand U-16
 Thailand U-19

2019 
 Air Force
 Bangkok
 BG Bundit Asia
 Chonburi Sports School
 Kasem Bundit University
 Lampang Sports School
 Nakhon Si Lady
 Sisaket Sports School
 Thailand U-16
 Thailand U-19
 Thammasat University

2020/21

2022-23

See also
 AFC Women's Club Championship

References

External links
 Official site
  League at thai-fussball.com
 sat.or.th

 
Women
Thailand
2009 establishments in Thailand
Sports leagues established in 2009
Women's sports leagues in Thailand
Professional sports leagues in Thailand